In skateboarding, grinds are tricks that involve the skateboarder sliding along a surface, making contact with the trucks of the skateboard. Grinds can be performed on any object narrow enough to fit between wheels and are performed on curbs, rails, the coping of a skate ramp, funboxes, ledges, and a variety of other surfaces.

History

The move likely originated in backyard pools in the early '70s , as the early skaters gained in skill and confidence with their high speed carves around the top of the pool walls and one day went that little bit  too high . The trucks of the time, often being merely 'borrowed' rollerskate trucks , didn't allow much contact due to their narrowness, but as skateboarding gained its own truck manufacturers who widened the hanger design, the possibilities for exploration became apparent, and all sorts of moves started popping up . There was a big leap in street skating starting in the '90s . It has evolved ever since. Today, grinds are commonly performed on handrails, lips of benches, tables, hubbas (ledge on a slope), on a hard normal ledge, a flatbar, or just simply anything that is possible enough to grind on it.

Property damage
Grinding is damaging to materials which are not hardened for the specific purpose of the sport, as may be found in a skate park. The trucks are composed of a hard metal without lubricant or bearings on the grinding surface, so they literally do grind on the objects they slide across. Grinding can strip paint off of steel and wear down the edges of concrete, stone, aluminum, and wood building materials. Affected business owners and government buildings have put up anti-skate devices as a deterrent to grinding. Grinding in public places may be seen as a form of vandalism and may cause skateboarding to be banned by business owners and city ordinances.

Back-side or front-side
Whether a grind is back-side (BS) or front-side (FS) depends on how rider approaches the rail or edge. If the skater approaches the rail with his back to it, the grind is a back-side grind. If the skater approaches the rail with the front of his body to the rail, the grind is a front-side grind.

List of grinds

50-50 grind

The 50-50 grind is where both trucks are on the edge. This move evolved from the horizontal-stance carve grind  in pools and was taken up on top of the lip by such skaters as Jay Adams, Tony Alva and Stacy Peralta. Also called "Axelgrind".

5-0 grind
Pronounced "Five-Oh". In this maneuver, the back truck grinds the rail/edge, while the front truck is suspended directly above the rail/edge. This move is similar to the manual, although the tail may be scraped against the obstacle as well as the back truck, which is not considered proper on a manual.

Smith grind
This trick was named after Mike Smith, who performed its frontside version in pools in the 1970's, though originally only a stall, whereas Allen Losi (in the 1980's) was probably one of the first to really do a grind version. The backside version, originally known as a Monty Grind, was originated in the 1980's by Florida powerhouse Monty Nolder. In a Smith Grind the back truck is grinding an edge or rail while the front truck hangs over the near side of the object, pointing downward, so that the edge of the deck rub the copping/edge. The street version of this trick (done on rails, ledges, hubas) is considered by many to be the most difficult basic grind trick.

Nosegrind
For a Nosegrind, the front truck grinds the obstacle, while the back truck is suspended over the rail/edge. It is similar to the nose manual, except performed on a rail, coping, or ledge. This move originated on vert, initially in the form of Neil Blender's New Deal (nose pivot to disaster), then by his more advanced progression of said move, the "Newer Deal", which left out the disaster part and just pivoted all the way back in.

Crooked grind
Also known as Crooks, Crux, Pointer Grind, or the K-grind after the man to whom the trick is most commonly accredited, Eric Koston. It is like a nosegrind, but the tail of the board is angled away from the rail/ledge on which the trick is performed, causing the edge of the deck's nose to also rub. Due to the lack of historical evidence there is no way to prove when this trick was first landed, nevertheless, both Eric Koston and Dan Peterka were the first two skaters documented purposely performing this trick in their respective H-Street's Next Generation video parts. As a result, both skateboarders are regarded as co-creators of this trick. 

Overcrook grind
Also known as Overcrooks, or Overcrux, is similar to the Crooked grind, but with the tail of the board being angled towards the far side of the rail/box.

Feeble grind
In this move, the back truck grinds a rail while the front truck hangs over the rail's far side. Professional skateboarer Josh Nelson is the inventor of this grind in 1986 at the Del Mar skate ranch in Del Mar, California. The name feeble grind came from Josh Nelson's friend and fellow skateboarder Sean Donnelley. Sean used to call Josh "the feeb" which was short for feeble, because Nelson was so skinny and often had broken limbs and injuries from skateboarding. Many people watched Josh create this unique type of grind on the parking blocks that were mounted in the reservoir at the Del Mar Skate Ranch. 

Salad grind
Invented by Eric "Salad" Dressen in the late 80's, who called it the ‘windshield wiper’, it was originally a variation of the stand up frontside grind (done on transition) where the front truck is hold raised up (the tail pressed downward and the back truck locked on the coping). It can be understood as a raised or "blunted" feeble grind.

Hurricane grind
The "cane" variations involve turning 180 to land in some sort of smith/feeble variation. Generally the "cane" variations should finish by turning back the way they came, so that the rider will land in the same stance from which he started(unless stated otherwise- ie. "hurricane to fakie".) The Hurricane is a 180 into a fakie feeble grind, and a 180 back out, landing in the original stance. It is a similar motion to a boardslide, but over-rotated so that the back truck locks on the obstacle. This trick was invented on vert by Neil Blender in 1985; an early proto-version can by witnessed in Powell Peralta's second video, Future Primitive, during Blender's brief cameo appearance on Lance Mountain's backyard ramp. 

Willy grind
Popularized by Willy Santos. Very rarely executed, the Willy is done with the front truck sliding on the grinding surface (as in a nose grind) while the back truck hangs down below the surface on the side to which the skateboarder approached. Also called "Lazy Grind", "Nosesmith", or "Scum Grind."

Losi grind
Popularized by Allen Losi. Can be best described as an Overcrook with the tail hanging below a rail or with wheels sliding along on a ledge or as a Willy with the tail on the other side of the obstacle. Also called "Nosefeeble," "Over Willy Grind" or "Over-Scum," or "Bag-Lady Grind."

Sugarcane grind
The Sugarcane is an alley-oop 180 into a fakie smith grind, and a 180 back out, landing in the original stance. It is a similar motion to a lipslide (where the back truck must pass over the obstacle), but over-rotated so that the back truck locks on the obstacle. 

Novacane grind
The Novacane is an alley-oop 180 into a switch feeble grind, with a 180 back out, landing in the original stance. It's a similar motion to the Sugarcane, but instead of landing the back truck on the obstacle in fakie smith, the front truck locks on in switch feeble. 

Note- Two missing "cane"-type variations. The alley-oop 180 into fakie feeble, and the alley-oop 180 into switch smith. These two moves are so rare as to have never been given proper names. It's unlikely to encounter either of these tricks unless the rider is skating on transition. 

Bennett grind
Popularized by Matt Bennett. For a Bennett grind the rider must approach frontside and do a backside 180 into a switch backside smith grind. This trick name is exclusively for the version of the trick where the rider approaches frontside.

Barley grind
The opposite of a Bennett. The rider approaches backside and does a frontside 180 into a switch frontside smith grind. This trick name is exclusively for the version of the trick where the rider approaches backside.

Suski grind
Popularized by Aaron Suski. Very similar to the 5-0 but the front truck is turned outward like a smith grind. The difference between a Smith and a Suski is that the tail is pressed downward and the front truck is raised up instead of being dipped low. Simply a raised or "blunted" smith grind.

Caveman grinds
A caveman grind is when a skater, instead of ollieing up onto a rail, starts with the board in his hand, places it onto the rail in the desired grind position and at the same time jumps onto the board, starting the grind.

5-0 hand drag
This trick is a 5-0 and while doing one, you drag your back hand on the rail/ledge.

Tractor grind
5-0 Hand Drag with the front hand

Nosegrind hand drag
This trick is a nosegrind while you drag your back hand on the rail/ledge.

Layback grind
This is a classic variation of the basic frontside or backside grind whereupon the skater leans back ("lays back") and places their trailing hand on or near the lip being ground, ostensibly to help "push" the grind further. Original Bones Brigade member Jay Smith did the earliest and most popular frontside examples, slashing out violently at the lip with his board while placing his hand well down the transition, in a very "surf-style" pose. By 1979 the move was being taken up on top of the lip (both truck and hand) by Duane Peters, the distinction being noted by the adjustment of the name to "layback roll-out", or, occasionally, "layback grind-to-tail". The backside version was introduced by Eddie "El Gato" Elguera later that same year.

Wax the rail
When you do a Nosegrind Hand Drag with the front hand. Invented by Brandon Tumber of Slaughterhouse fame.

Primo slides/grinds
When in rail stance and slide on the ledge slash rail. Primo grind in when you grind on both wheels/bearings in rail stance.

Body varial grinds
When you turn your body 180 while the board slides. Almost always done on grind that doesn't require pressure with feet.

5-0 overturn
When the rider does a 5-0 and turns 180 while grinding to turn the trick into a nosegrind.

Nosegrind overturn
 Also called Nosegrind to Pivot. When the rider is grinding on the front truck and turns 180 while grinding, making it into a 5-0.

Crail grind
5-0 Back hand nosegrab

Seatbelt grind
Nosegrind front hand tailgrab.

Coffin 50-50
While lying on the board on your back whilst you're doing a 50-50 grind. Invented by Mark Nicolson (Death Skateboards, Squadrophenia 2004).

Tailblock grind
Tailslide nosegrab

Noseblock grind
Nosegrind tailgrab

Hang-ten nosegrind
Nosegrind when both of your feet are on the nose with your toes pointing forward.

Hang-five nosegrind
A one footed nose grind with your toe pointing forward.

Handstand grinds
Require a long rail. Jump into a grind, then do a handstand on the board while grinding.

References 

Skateboarding
Skateboarding tricks